The S2 7.3 is an American trailerable sailboat that was designed by Arthur Edmunds as a racer-cruiser and first built in 1978. The designation indicates the approximate length overall in meters.

Production
The design was built by S2 Yachts in Holland, Michigan, United States from 1978 until 1987, with 404 boats completed, but it is now out of production.

Design
The S2 7.3 is a recreational keelboat, built predominantly of fiberglass, with wood trim. It has a masthead sloop rig, a raked stem, a slightly reverse transom, an internally mounted spade-type rudder controlled by a tiller and a fixed fin keel or optional shoal draft keel that was designed by Graham & Schlageter. It displaces  and carries  of lead ballast.

The boat is normally fitted with a small  outboard motor for docking and maneuvering.

The design has sleeping accommodation for four people, with a double "V"-berth in the bow cabin and two straight settee berths in the main cabin. The galley is located on the port side abeam the companionway ladder and is equipped with a single sink. The head is located in the bow cabin on the port side, under the "V"-berth.

Operational history
In a 2010 review Steve Henkel wrote, "best features: Good space below for a 24-footer. Worst features: The old-fashioned keel design exposes so much wetted surface that we can't help but assume it slows her down in light air, compared with her comps."

See also
List of sailing boat types

References

Keelboats
1970s sailboat type designs
Sailing yachts
Trailer sailers
Sailboat type designs by Arthur Edmunds
Sailboat types built by S2 Yachts